
Castleton may refer to:

Places

Canada
Castleton, Ontario

United Kingdom

England
Castleton, Derbyshire
Castleton, Dorset
Castleton, Greater Manchester
Castleton, North Yorkshire

Scotland
Castleton, Scottish Borders (Roxburghshire)
Castleton, Angus, a village

Wales
Castleton, Newport

United States
Castleton, Indiana, a neighborhood (formerly a separate small town) in Indianapolis
Castleton Square, a large mall in Castleton, Indiana
Castleton, Kansas
Castleton, Maryland
Castleton Township, Michigan
Castleton, Staten Island, in New York City
Castleton-on-Hudson, New York, in Rensselaer County
Castleton, Utah, a ghost town
Castleton Tower, Moab, Utah
Castleton, Vermont
Castleton (village), Vermont, in the town of Castleton
Castleton University
Castleton, Virginia

Surname
Roy Castleton
Gavin Castleton
Castleton baronets

Other
Castleton station (disambiguation), stations of the name
Castleton china, fine china and tableware produced by Shenango China, New Castle, Pennsylvania

See also
Castle town